Yureni Noshika (born 29 January 1984) is an actress in Sri Lankan cinema and television as well as a singer and media personality. Noshika began her career winning the Miss Sri Lanka for Miss World contest and went on to commercials before making it in the television and movie industries.

Early life 
Noshika was born in Sri Lanka as the only child in the family. Raised Christian, she studied at Methodist College in Colombo. Noshika was gaining qualifications to follow a career in law but this is currently on hold due to her acting obligations.

Career 
Noshika won the "Models of the New Generation" pageant hosted by Derana TV in 2006, and went on to represent Sri Lanka at the Tourism World contest. Her potential for acting and musical talents were evident and she decided to follow a career in these fields, opting out of following a law career, which was her next preferred choice. After appearing in the TV commercials for Coca-Cola and Nestlé among many others, she was picked to appear in the teledrama Kindurangana, which was a remake for the Sri Lanka television market of the Hindi television serial Kasam Se.  This was a joint venture between Balaji Telefilms of India and the Maharaja organization of Sri Lanka.

Subsequently, she has appeared in many TV serials such as Kindurangana, Sanda Sakki, Arora, Sihina Sindrella, Ayal, and Pingaladanauwwa among others. Noshika entered the movie industry in 2009 and was immediately cast into one of the lead roles in the film Nino Live. The movie went on to gain both critical acclaim and commercial success. Moreover, she also won the best supporting actress award in Raigam Tele'es.

She entered the music industry in 2015 with Saree Pote & has released her second single Chewing Gum (Wage Kollo) in 2017. She also guest starred in the film Rush and played the lead role in Kasun Pathirana's debut film Knight Rider as her third cinema appearance.

Other activities 
Noshika has her own regular fitness column in the Daily News. Following her success and the experience gained thereafter, Noshika was selected to be a judge for the Miss Sri Lanka Online contest in 2012.

Reality Shows & Competitions

Television appearances 
 Kindurangana (2009)
 Ayal (2009) 
 Pingala Danawwa (2009) 
 Sihina Cinderella (2010)
 Piyavi (2012) 
 Koombiyo (2017)

Filmography

Discography 
Singles as lead artist

Beauty pageants

Awards and accolades

References

External links

 Yureni Noshika official website (English)
 විශ්වය මට හොඳම දේ දෙනවා

Sri Lankan film actresses
Sinhalese actresses
Living people
Alumni of Methodist College, Colombo
1984 births
Sri Lankan television actresses